Maublancancylistes is a genus of beetles in the family Cerambycidae, containing the following species:

 Maublancancylistes maublanci Lepesme & Breuning, 1956
 Maublancancylistes mirei Breuning, 1969

References

Acanthocinini
Cerambycidae genera
Beetles of Africa
Taxa named by Stephan von Breuning (entomologist)
Taxa named by Pierre Lepesme